Allium tubiflorum is a plant species native to China (Gansu, Hebei, Henan, Hubei, Shaanxi, Shanxi, Sichuan) at elevations less than 2000 m.

Allium tubiflorum is one of the few species of Allium lacking the characteristic onion/garlic scent. It produces bulbs that are solitary, round to egg-shaped, up to 20 cm across. Scapes are up to 40 cm tall. Leaves are tubular, up to 3 mm across, about the same length as the scapes. Umbels have a few red or purple flowers.

References

External links
 line drawing of Allium tubiflorum, Flora of China Illustrations vol. 24, fig. 232, 1-4 

tubiflorum
Onions
Flora of China
Plants described in 1906